Mertarvik (Yup'ik: Mertarvik [məχ'təχvik] English:  /məg'təgvɪk/ Mug-TUG-vik) is a village in the Bethel Census Area, Alaska. In 2019 the first residents from the town of Newtok, which is eroding, began to arrive.

By 2020, about 130 residents were there. In 2020, the State of Alaska had not sent voting primary forms to the village because of how new it was.

Education
The Lower Kuskokwim School District operates the Mertarvik Pioneer School, which is a continuation of Newtok's Ayaprun School. As of 2020, it uses temporary facilities in the Mertarvik Education Center (MEC) before a permanent school is to be constructed. The school has teachers using English and Yugtun as mediums of instruction. The Mertarvik school's initial enrollment was 10 and it began operations on October 14, 2019. It initially had four teachers, with half using each language as a medium.

References

Bethel Census Area, Alaska